The human gene ATP5PD encodes subunit d of the peripheral stalk part of the enzyme mitochondrial ATP synthase.

Mitochondrial ATP synthase catalyzes ATP synthesis, utilizing an electrochemical gradient of protons across the inner membrane during oxidative phosphorylation. It is composed of two linked multi-subunit complexes: the soluble catalytic core, F1, and the membrane-spanning component, F0, which comprises the proton channel. The F1 complex consists of 5 different subunits (alpha, beta, gamma, delta, and epsilon) assembled in a ratio of 3 alpha, 3 beta, and a single representative of the other 3. The Fo seems to have nine subunits (a, b, c, d, e, f, g, F6 and 8). This gene encodes the d subunit of the Fo complex. 
Alternatively spliced transcript variants encoding different isoforms have been identified for this gene. In addition, three pseudogenes are located on chromosomes 9, 12 and 15.

References

External links

Further reading